Wǔ Shìyuē (559–635 CE) was the father of Wu Zetian, the only woman in the history of China to assume the title of Empress Regnant. He was posthumously honored the title of King Zhongxiao, Wu was the son of Wu Hua and became a timber merchant. He was also known as the Duke of Ying and King of Wei serving as army commander of Yingyang Prefecture during the final years of Emperor Yang of Sui (r. 605–618 CE) and subsequently as Minister of Revenue and superintendent of Jingzhou City, Hubei during the reign of Emperor Taizong of Tang (r. 627–649 CE).

Initially, Wu married a woman from the Xiangli family, who gave birth to two sons named Wu Yuanqing and Wu Yuanshuang. Later he remarried a woman from the noble Yang family of the Hong Nong region. She was daughter, niece, and sister to several ministers and a close relation of the imperial family. By her, Wu had three daughters: Wu Shun (later the Lady of Han), Wu Zhao (Empress Wu Zetian) and the Lady of Guo.

After Wu died in 635 CE, his two sons were rude to their stepmother; after Wu Zetian came to power, she banished her half-brothers from the imperial court. At the same time she named her sister Lady of Han's son Helan Minzhi as heir to her father. However, Wu Zetian became displeased with Helan Minzhi's conduct and sent him into exile where he died. Thereafter she recalled Wu Yuanshuang's son Wu Chengsi from exile and made him Wu Shiyue's successor.

Posthumously, Wu Shiyue ("yue" being an alternate reading of 彠, and is considered to be the correct one) received the titles of Zhou Zhongxiao Emperor and Supreme Founding Emperor of the Southern Zhou Dynasty (690–705).

Family 
Furen, of the Xiangli clan (相里夫人)
Wu Yuanqing, Prince Xian of Liang (武元庆梁宪王), first son
Wu Yuanshuang, Prince De of Wei (武元爽 魏德王), second son
Empress Xiaomingao, of the Yang clan (孝明高皇后)
Wu Shun, Lady of Han (武顺 韓國夫人), first daughter
Married Helan Yueshi (賀蘭安石) and had issue (one son and one daughter Lady Helan)
Wu Zetian, Empress Tang and Zhou (武則天), second daughter
Married Li Shimin (李世民), the second son of Li Yuan (李淵)
Married Li Zhi (李治), the ninth son of Li Shimin (李世民), and had issue (four sons and two daughter)
Lady Wu, Lady of Guo (郭孝慎), third daughter

Sources 
This article is based on a translation of Chinese Wikipedia.

Notes
a:  
b:  
c:  
d:  
e:  
f:  
g:  
h:  
i:  
j:  
k:  
l:  
m:  
n:  
o:  
p:  
q:  
r:  
s:  

Tang dynasty politicians
Tang dynasty generals
Sui dynasty politicians
559 births
635 deaths
Political office-holders in Hubei